Camtasia (formerly Camtasia Studio and Camtasia for Mac) is a software suite, created and published by TechSmith, for creating and recording video tutorials and presentations via screencast (screen recording), or via a direct recording plug-in to Microsoft PowerPoint. Other multimedia recordings (microphone, webcam and system audio) may be recorded at the same time or added separately (like background music and narration/voice tracks). Camtasia is available in English, French, German, Japanese, Portuguese, Spanish and Chinese versions.

Features 
The features are structured around the three main steps of the program workflow: recording, editing and export/sharing. 

The first step is to record a video (from a specific region or fullscreen) with Camtasia Recorder. Multi-display configurations are supported.

The second step is to edit the recorded video in Camtasia, adding transitions and annotations with its editing features and effects, such as cursor effects and visual effects.

The third step is to export the produced video as a local file (MP4 or other file type), or to upload it to a media or file-sharing platform such as YouTube or Google Drive.

Camtasia Recorder 
In Camtasia Recorder, users can start and stop recording with shortcuts at any time, at which point the recording is halted, and Camtasia Recorder can render the input that has been captured into the TREC format. The TREC file can be saved to disk or directly imported into the Camtasia component for editing. Camtasia Recorder allows audio (and webcam) recording while screen recording is in progress, so the presenter can capture live narration during a tutorial or presentation. Camtasia also supports dubbing in other audio tracks or voiceover during post-capture editing. Windows users may also install an add-in for Microsoft PowerPoint that will allow them to initiate recording of a presentation from within PowerPoint itself.

Camtasia 
In Camtasia (also known as the Editor), the Media Bin is where media (screen recordings, voice-overs, etc.) for the current project are stored. The Library stores reusable media across multiple projects. On the Timeline, overlays of various types like annotations may be added, including user-defined settings, such as when and how to display the cursor and pan-and-zoom effects such as the Ken Burns effect. In order to provide localized versions of the produced videos, subtitles can be added with the captioning feature.

The Editor allows import of various types of video, audio and image files including MP4, AVI, MP3, WAV, PNG, JPEG, and other formats into the Camtasia proprietary TREC format, which is readable and editable by Camtasia. The TREC file format (using TSC2 Codec) is a single container for various multimedia objects including video clips, images, screen captures and audio/video effects. On computers where Camtasia is not installed, you can download the TSC2 Codec for free to play TREC files.

The produced video can be exported as a local file: MP4, animated GIF, AVI (Windows version only), MOV (Mac version only), or uploaded directly to a media or file-sharing platform (YouTube, Google Drive, etc.).

By default, Camtasia projects are stored as standalone projects in  format (cross-platform file format).

See also
 Comparison of screencasting software
 Distance education
 Instructional design
 Podcast

References

External links
 

2002 software
Screencasting software
Shareware
Windows multimedia software
MacOS multimedia software